The Convent of Jesus and Mary, Karachi is a private Catholic primary schools for boys and girls and a secondary school for girls only, located in Karachi, Pakistan. Founded in 1952, the school is owned by the Roman Catholic Archdiocese of Karachi. Admissions for the school are held around March.

Overview 
The school is divided into three sections: 
 Preschool section—Class Prep 1 to Prep 2 (Age 4–6)
 Junior section—Class 1 to Class 5 (Age 6-11)
 Senior section—Class 6 to Class 11 (Age 11–16)

The school goes by the Cambridge System. CJM was started in Karachi with an aim to educate the girls of the clifton area, and has flourished ever since. Although it is a Catholic school, the majority of the student body is made up of Muslims. There are also Parsis and Hindus.

In addition to schooling the local Christian community, the Convent of Jesus and Mary, Karachi (along with its affiliate schools in Lahore, Murree, Mariakhel, Shadbagh, Sialkot, and Toba Tek Singh) have long been Pakistan's most elite all-girls educational institution. CJM has traditionally been run by Irish nuns, and now in recent decades, local nuns as well. It has schooled influential women, including Pakistan's first female Prime Minister, other leaders, social workers, activists, professionals, entrepreneurs, writers, entertainers, philanthropists, home-makers, and a countless number of women in the creative arts.

In 2012 Sister John Berchmans Conway was the Principal of the Convent of Jesus and Mary, Karachi. On February 15, 2012, the President of Pakistan approved conferment of Sitara Quaid-e-Azam on Sister Berchmans for her services towards education and promoting interfaith harmony in Pakistan. The government of Sindh presented land in Karachi to the sisters in appreciation of their educational work in the country. Sister John Berchmans Conway received the papers on behalf of the sisters.

In 2019 the principal was Sr. Mary Langan RJM.

Houses
Each section of the school is divided into four groups: 
  Courtesy   (Blue)
  Discipline (Green)
  Endeavor    (Red)
  Service    (Yellow)

Notable alumni

 Somy Ali, actress, fashion designer, journalist
 Benazir Bhutto (1953 - 2007) former prime minister of Pakistan
 Sharmeen Obaid-Chinoy, two Academy Award-winning filmmaker
 Tehmina Janjua, Ambassador of Pakistan to Italy
 Nergis Mavalvala, Pakistani American astrophysicist who is the Kathleen Marble Professor of Astrophysics at the Massachusetts Institute of Technology (MIT)

References

External links
 Official website

Schools in Karachi
Girls' schools in Pakistan
Catholic secondary schools in Pakistan
Catholic elementary and primary schools in Pakistan
1952 establishments in Pakistan
Educational institutions established in 1952